The Sydney International Shooting Centre in Cecil Park, New South Wales, Australia was built for the shooting events at the 2000 Summer Olympics. It has also been used for ISSF World Cup events in 2002, 2004, 2007 and the 2007 rifle and pistol events. It has hosted the Oceania Shooting Federation Championships since 1999 and is available for licensed shooters to use the facilities on a day-by-day basis.

See also
Sydney International Shooting Centre
 2000 Summer Olympics venues

References
2000 Summer Olympics official report. Volume 1. p. 380.

Venues of the 2000 Summer Olympics
Olympic shooting venues
Shooting ranges in Australia
Sports venues in Sydney
Shooting sports in Australia